Severino is the seventh studio album by Brazilian rock band Os Paralamas do Sucesso. It was released in 1994 and produced by famous record producer Phil Manzanera. It was their most experimental album.

The sonority and lyrical themes of Severino were heavily influenced by the popular music and the culture of Northeast Brazil, and the poetry of famous writer João Cabral de Melo Neto (most notably his masterpiece Morte e Vida Severina). However, like the previous album Os Grãos, it received mostly mixed to negative reviews at the time of its release, and suffered from extremely poor sales: it sold only 55,000 copies. However, the album was better received in Argentina.

Severino spawned minor hits such as "El Vampiro Bajo el Sol", "Vamo Batê Lata", "Navegar Impreciso", "Varal", "Go Back" (a Spanish-language cover of Titãs' song of the same name), and "Casi un Segundo" (a Spanish-language translation of the Paralamas' song "Quase um Segundo" from their 1988 album Bora Bora).

Queen guitarist Brian May made a special appearance on this album, providing guitars for the track "El Vampiro Bajo el Sol".

The album's cover was drawn by the famous schizophrenic artist from Northeast Brazil Arthur Bispo do Rosário.

Track listing

Personnel
Os Paralamas do Sucesso
 Bi Ribeiro – bass
 Herbert Vianna – guitar, vocals
 João Barone – drums, percussion

Additional musicians
 Brian May – guitar in "El Vampiro Bajo el Sol"
 Egberto Gismonti – keyboards in "Casi un Segundo"
 Fito Páez
 Linton Kwesi Johnson
 Reggae Philharmonic Orchestra
 Tom Zé – backing vocals in "Músico"

References

1994 albums
Os Paralamas do Sucesso albums
EMI Records albums